Ivan Lysiak Rudnytsky (27 October 1919 – 25 April 1984) was a  historian of Ukrainian socio-political thought, political scientist and scholar publicist. He significantly influenced Ukrainian historical and political thought by writing over 200 historical essays, commentaries and reviews, and also serving as editor of several book publications.  He has been praised one of the most influential Ukrainian historians of the twentieth century.  He is sometimes referred to as Ivan Łysiak-Rudnytsky, but the surname he used was his mother’s name Rudnytsky.

Personal background
Ivan Rudnytsky was born in Vienna, Austria where his parents were residing as political refugees from Galicia, which had been invaded by Poland in the aftermath of its successful war against the West Ukrainian People's Republic (1918 – 1919).  His father  was a lawyer and his mother Milena Rudnytska was a professor and politician.  Both were well-known social and political activists from well connected families. In his youth, Ivan grew to become an intellectual gourmet growing up within the intensely stimulating environment of the extended Rudnytsky family of luminaries:  (prominent political leader and publicist of Ukrainian identity),  (literary scholar, literary critic, translator),  (conductor and composer) and Volodymyr Rudnytsky (lawyer and social activist).  After his parents divorced when Ivan was 2 years old he lived with his mother, but his material needs to support his intellectual pursuits were taken care of up to 1953 in large part due to his father and mother’s financial help.

Intellectual development
Rudnytsky began his academic career at the University of Lviv in interwar Poland where he studied law in the years 1937–1939.  After the Soviet annexation of Galicia, his mother believed it was only a matter of time before the NKVD would arrest her and so she fled with her son to Krakow, and then in 1940 to Berlin.  There he was awarded his masters degree in international relations in 1943 from the Friedrich Wilhelm University.  Fearing discovery of their Jewish heritage, he fled with his mother to Prague, Czechoslovakia and continued his studies at Karl-Ferdinands-Universität, receiving his doctorate in History in 1945.  His doctoral advisor was the noted scholar of slavic studies, who held Rudnytsky’s oral doctoral defence on a Prague street during an air raid prior to Soviet occupation.

Driven by a desire to combat the influence of the Ukrainian nationalists, Rudnytsky became a leading member of several student organizations in the 1940s. He was a briefly a member of a conservative, monarchist hetmanite organization  but was expelled in 1940 by the leadership for meeting an old acquaintance of his mother’s who was associated with the Ukrainian People's Republic, an action they regarded as political treason.

After the war, Rudnytsky attended the Geneva Graduate Institute where he worked on his second doctorate and where in 1949 he met and married an American Quaker, Joanne Benton.  Rudnytsky studied English intensely, and in 1951 he emigrated to the USA. Having been informed it would be difficult to secure a good professorship without a US degree, he resumed work on his second doctoral dissertation at Columbia. By 1953 his funding had run out, and he took a position teaching history at the University of Wisconsin in Madison and later at La Salle University in Philadelphia from 1956 to 1967. He received his first permanent position in 1967 at the American University in Washington D.C.  From 1971 to his death in 1984, he was a professor at the University of Alberta, a founder of the Canadian Institute of Ukrainian Studies (CIUS), a member of the Shevchenko Scientific Society and the Ukrainian Free Academy of Sciences.

Focus of work
As a result of his early interest in German transcendental philosophy of the 19th and 20th centuries, Rudnytsky’s chief academic interest became the study of historical cognition. In keeping with the evolutionary outlook of idealism characteristic in German historicism, Rudnytsky used history to understand the development of socio-political thought, particularly that of Ukraine from the mid-nineteenth century to the 1930s. 

The main focus of Rudnytsky’s work revolved around the following topics:
 The concept and problem of “historical” and “non-historical” nations;
 The intellectual origins of modern Ukraine and the structure of nineteenth-century Ukrainian history;
 The problem of the intelligentsia and intellectual development in Ukraine in the nineteenth and twentieth centuries;
 Galicia under the Habsburg Empire and its contribution to the Ukrainian struggle for statehood;
 The Ukrainian revolution of 1917—21 and the Fourth Universal in the historical context of Ukrainian political thought, or autonomy vs. independence;
 Ukraine within the Soviet system;
 Galician Ukrainian inter-war nationalism;
 Ukrainians and their nearest neighbours, the Poles and the Russians;
 1848 in Galicia: an evaluation of political pamphlets.

Legacy
According to Eastern Europe historian Timothy Snyder, Rudnytsky decisively argued against the proposition that Ukraine ought to be a homogeneous nation - that it should be exclusively for and about people who spoke Ukrainian and shared Ukrainian culture. Rudnytsky believed, as Mykhailo Hrushevsky did, in Ukraine's social historical continuity of development towards an independent democratic nation, and also believed, as Vyacheslav Lypynsky did, that its destiny was to be pluralistic. The opposing view in Ukraine was championed by Dmytro Dontsov who took his cues from Italian fascism and became the far right conservative voice of Ukrainian ethnic nationalism.  According to Snyder, Rudnytsky’s response to ethnic nationalism won the argument, both in Ukraine and among North American Ukrainian expatriates, about what the Ukrainian nation should be. Instead of the nation looking for legitimacy in dubious historical claims or assertions of a homogeneous culture, Rudnytsky’s view was that a nation is fundamentally the result of political acts of commitment directed at a common future, which means that in principle, anyone can take part in it.

Works

Books
 
 

Books in Ukrainian:

Rudnytsky edited books

Individual essays
 

•
•
•
•
•
•
•
•
•
•
•
•

•
•
•
•
•
•
•
•
•
•
•

 
  (WP article: Mykhailo Drahomanov)
  (WP article: Ukrainian Radical party))
 
 
 
  (WP article: Transcarpathia)
  (WP article: Vyacheslav Lypynsky)
  (WP article: Tomáš Masaryk)
 
  (WP article: Hipolit Volodymyr Terletsky)

References

Bibliography
 
 
  
 
 
 
 
 
 
 
 
 
 
 

1919 births
1984 deaths
Historians of Ukraine
Theoretical historians
People from Lviv Oblast
Writers from Lviv

Ukrainian emigrants to Canada
Ukrainian expatriates in Canada
Ukrainian male writers
University of Lviv alumni
Humboldt University of Berlin alumni
Charles University alumni
Graduate Institute of International and Development Studies alumni
Columbia University alumni
American University faculty and staff
Academic staff of the University of Alberta
Members of the Shevchenko Scientific Society
20th-century Ukrainian historians
20th-century Canadian historians
20th-century Canadian male writers